Things That Go Bump in the Night is a line which might have originated in a traditional Scottish or Cornish poem or prayer and may refer to:

Television
 "Things That Go Bump in the Night" (Dad's Army episode), a 1973 episode of the British television Dad's Army
 "Things That Go Bump in the Night", an episode of Rising Damp
 "Things That Go Bump in the Night", an episode of In a Heartbeat
 "Things That Go Bump in the Night", an episode of Midsomer Murders
 "Things That Go Bump in the Night", an episode of The Bill
 Things That Go Bump in the Night, a 1989 TV film by Christine Cromwell starring Jaclyn Smith

Other uses
 And Things That Go Bump in the Night, a play by Terrence McNally
 Things That Go Bump in the Night, a 1960s band of which Eric Carr was a member
 "Things That Go Bump in the Night" (Allstars song)), a song by allSTARS*
 Things That Go Bump in the Night, a 1943 Starman story arc from DC Comics
 Things That Go Bump In The Night Film Festival, a film festival in Bay City, Michigan
 Things That Go Pump in the Night, a 1990 music video by Aerosmith
 "Things That Go Piglet in the Night", an episode of The New Adventures of Winnie the Pooh

See also
 Bogeyman
 Bump in the Night (disambiguation)
 Personalities and Things that Go Bump in the Night, a set of scale model miniatures
 Things That Go Bump (disambiguation)